Events in the year 2023 in Mongolia.

Incumbents 

 President: Ukhnaagiin Khürelsükh
 Prime Minister: Luvsannamsrain Oyun-Erdene

Events

Sport 
 2023 East Asian Youth Games

References 

 
2020s in Mongolia
Years of the 21st century in Mongolia
Mongolia
Mongolia